Stanford Bernard Rome (born June 4, 1956) is a former American football wide receiver in the National Football League. He was drafted by the Kansas City Chiefs in the 11th round of the 1979 NFL Draft. He played college football at Clemson.

Rome also played college basketball at Clemson and was drafted by the Cleveland Cavaliers in the fourth round of the 1978 NBA Draft.

Personal life
His son, Brandon Frye, played college football at Virginia Tech and played in the NFL from 2007 to 2009. Another son, Jay Rome, plays college football at Georgia.

References

1956 births
Living people
American football wide receivers
Clemson Tigers football players
Clemson Tigers men's basketball players
Kansas City Chiefs players
Cleveland Cavaliers draft picks
American men's basketball players
People from Valdosta, Georgia